Wyra Assembly constituency is a ST reserved constituency of Telangana Legislative Assembly, India. It is one among 10 constituencies in Khammam district. It is part of Khammam Lok Sabha constituency .

In 2019 Assembly elections Lavudya Ramulu Nayak was elected as MLA as independent and joined in Bharat Rashtra Samithi.

Mandals
The Assembly Constituency presently comprises the following Mandals:

Members of Legislative Assembly

Election results

Telangana Legislative Assembly election, 2018

Telangana Legislative Assembly election, 2014

See also
 List of constituencies of Telangana Legislative Assembly

References

Assembly constituencies of Telangana
Khammam district
Constituencies established in 2009
2009 establishments in Andhra Pradesh